The 2013–14 season was Feyenoord's 106th season of play, it marked its 58th season in the Eredivisie and its 92nd consecutive season in the top flight of Dutch football. They ended their league campaign as runners-up. They entered the KNVB Cup in the second round and reached the quarter-final. Their Europa League appearance consisted of the play-off round. It was the third straight season with manager Ronald Koeman, who did not renew his contract at the conclusion of the season.

The club had one of their worst season starts ever; they lost three straight in the league – reaching a season-worst 17th position after three rounds – and both their European appearances against FC Kuban Krasnodar. Because they only lost two more games in the first half of the season, they climbed to fourth place in the table at the halfway mark. They won three KNVB Cup games to eventually succumb to the eventual runners-up in the quarter-finals. The team ended the season on a high note with a seven-game winning streak before drawing the last game of the season. This led to a second-place finish in the 2013–14 Eredivisie, a place that qualified Feyenoord for the third qualifying round in the 2014–15 UEFA Champions League. Overall Feyenoord won 23 matches, drew 7 and lost 10 during the season. Graziano Pellè was the season topscorer with 26 goals, of which 23 occurred in the Eredivisie.

Background
The 2013–14 season marked the third year of Ronald Koeman's tenure as manager at Feyenoord. In his first year Feyenoord finished second in the league table and in the 2012–13 season they took third place, which qualified the club for the play-off round of the Europa League in 2013–14. In January 2013 they signed Graziano Pellè for four years after he played for the club on loan for the 2012–13 season and after he ended the season as the club's top scorer.

Review and events

Pre-season

Feyenoord had its first training session in the Kuip on 26 June 2013 in front of 5,000 fans. In the first half of July they played and won four friendly games against amateur sides. Feyenoord played Eerste Divisie side FC Dordrecht to close out their Dutch summer friendlies and drew the game away in Dordrecht. On 21 July Feyenoord had its annual Open Dag (Open Day) which was visited by 40,000 fans. Four new players were flown into the Kuip per helicopter and the full team was officially presented to the fans. Feyenoord then went on a training camp in Levico Terme and played the Italian side Hellas Verona there, a game that ended in a defeat. Feyenoord ended the pre-season preparation with a 3–1 home win over Getafe.

August–October
Feyenoord started the 2013–14 Eredivisie campaign on the road against PEC Zwolle on 4 August 2013 with a stoppage time loss. Later that week Feyenoord was drawn against European debutant FC Kuban Krasnodar from Russia for the play-off round of the Europa league. They finished their home opener on 11 August with nine men, which resulted in a three-goal loss against FC Twente. Later that week the club announced it had loaned forward Samuel Armenteros for one season from Anderlecht. The following Sunday they played De Klassieker away and lost by one goal after an early lead. Feyenoord opened their European season 22 August 2013 in Russia and lost to FC Kuban Krasnodar, with Ibrahima Baldé scoring the only goal of the match. Feyenoord won their second home game of the season 25 August against NAC, due to a hattrick by Graziano Pellè of which two goals were scored in two consecutive minutes. The second leg of the Europa League play-off round was played 29 August at home in De Kuip, where they lost 1–2 and were eliminated from the tournament.

Feyenoord opened September with a 4–0 home win on the first day of the month against Roda JC. Four different Feyenoord players scored in the game; Vormer and Pellè in the first half and Nelom and Goossens after half time. The club announced halfway through the month they had signed Otman Bakkal without transfer fee. Bakkal had played for Feyenoord in the 2011–12 season as well before joining Russian club Dynamo Moscow for the 2012–13 season. On 15 September Feyenoord played the second game of the month in Nijmegen against N.E.C., the game ended in a 3-all draw after a last-minute equalizer by Bruno Martins Indi. The club got their third win in four league matches on 22 September at home due to the lone goal in the 35th minute from Tonny Vilhena against FC Utrecht. After a bye in the first round, Feyenoord started the 2013–14 KNVB Cup on the 26th at home against FC Dordrecht in the second round. They won the game 3–0; Pellè put the first goal on the board after 36 minutes, Schaken and Armenteros added a goal each to the scoreline in the second half. Feyenoord won the last match of September 4–2 at home against ADO Den Haag. They got up by four goals 18 minutes into the second half after a hattrick by Pellè and first half goal by Martins Indi; ADO got two goals on the board in the last ten minutes. From the five games in September, four league games and one cup game, Feyenoord drew one and won the other four.

Feyenoord started October on the road against Vitesse Arnhem on 6 October with a 1–2 win after two first half goals by De Vrij and Pellè. Pellè's goal marked his tenth league goal this season. Their second match in October was played away in Deventer against Go Ahead Eagles on the 19th. The game ended in a 2–2 draw after Feyenoord gained the lead twice by goals of De Vrij and Immers. The team played Heracles Almelo at home on the 27th resulting in a 1–2 loss after a first half own goal by Nelom and second half red card for Pellè. Jean-Paul Boëtius scored the lone home goal at the end of the first half in Feyenoord's first ever home defeat against Heracles. Feyenoord played their last game of the month in the KNVB Cup against HSV Hoek at home on the 30th. They won this third round match 3–0 against the Hoofdklasse side due to a Vandepitte own goal and further goals by Bakkal and Te Vrede.

November–February
Feyenoord headed to Cambuur Leeuwarden in the beginning of November, resulting in a 0–2 win with goals by Immers and Te Vrede. The win moved Feyenoord back into fourth place in the league table. The club hosted AZ in the second week of November for a 2–2 draw. Te Vrede and Immers scored 3 minutes apart just after half time; the final score was reached after Jóhannsson successfully converted a penalty. During the international match break Feyenoord played a friendly behind closed doors against FC Groningen, a game they won 4–1. Feyenoord closed out the month of November with a road game against RKC Waalwijk. They lost the game due to a lone 93rd-minute goal by their opponent.

Feyenoord opened December with a home game against PSV. The visitors took an early lead but Boëtius scored an equalizer in the first half stoppage time. Pellè added a penalty goal in the second half; several minutes later he got another attempt which he missed. Pellè later added another goal to the tally for a 3–1 Feyenoord win. The team moved back into fourth place in the league table after the first 15 games of the season. On 8 December Feyenoord played SC Heerenveen on the road. Feyenoord scored twice within the first quarter of an hour; Boëtius opened the score and Immers doubled the lead. The game ended as a 2–1 win after Heerenveen got on the board at the stroke of half-time. The win kept Feyenoord in fourth place in the Eredivisie standings. On 15 December, Feyenoord played FC Groningen at home. Pellè scored the lone goal of the game in the seventh minute of play. This third consecutive win kept Feyenoord in fourth place at the halfway mark of the season with 30 points from 17 matches. Feyenoord played their fourth round KNVB cup match in Almelo against Heracles Almelo on 18 December. Pellè scored after 11 minutes, Heracles equalized midway through the first half. Three minutes into extra time De Vrij received a second yellow card; Feyenoord kept the 1–1 score throughout extra time with ten men. In the penalty shootout all initial ten shooters scored. Clasie scored the sixth Feyenoord penalty before Heracles' Rienstra missed, sending Feyenoord to the quarter-finals of the KNVB Cup. Feyenoord's last game of 2013, at home against PEC Zwolle, marked their 2000th professional league game. They won the game 3–0 due to two first half goals in a seven-minute span by Immers and an early second half goal by Boëtius. This marked the last game before the winter break. Their five-game winning streak led them to fourth place in the league and the quarter-finals of the cup heading into the new year.

Early in January Feyenoord announced they parted ways with Cissé. On 5 January, the club played a charity match in De Kuip against Excelsior to support cancer research. They won 1–0 after a late goal by Vilhena. After this friendly they went to Marbella for a one-week training camp which ended with the second and last friendly of the winter break. They lost this game 0–1 against reigning Swiss champion FC Basel. Feyenoord resumed the season on 19 January with a 5–2 away win against FC Utrecht in a game in which the club trailed twice. Schaken scored both in the first and second half; Pellè, De Vrij and Vilhena all added to the scoreline once. On 22 January, Feyenoord got knocked out of the KNVB Cup in the quarter-finals in a 3–1 loss to Ajax. The following Saturday Feyenoord lost 3–2 away at ADO Den Haag. Feyenoord's last match of the month was played at home on the 31st against Vitesse Arnhem. The match ended in a 1–1 draw after a first half goal by Pellè.

A day after the draw against Vitesse, Ronald Koeman announced he would end his tenure as manager of Feyenoord at the end of the 2013–14 season. On 4 February the team beat Roda JC away 2–1. Immers and Armenteros scored to take a two-goal lead at half time, Roda got on the board near the end of the game. The win moved Feyenoord to two points behind Vitesse. The following Saturday Feyenoord played N.E.C. at home. The visitors took an early lead, before Immers and Pellè gave Feyenoord a one-goal advantage at half time. An additional goal by Pellè and two scores from Boëtius led to a 5–1 win that led Feyenoord to third place in the league table. On 16 February the club played away at NAC Breda. The game ended in a 1–1 draw; Janmaat scored the lone Feyenoord goal in the first half before NAC equalized from a penalty kick. Feyenoord played their last February match on the 23rd away against FC Twente. They created a two-goal lead halfway in the second half from goals by Pellè and Boëtius before Twente scored twice to lead to a 2–2 draw. The last goal came after 5 minutes of stoppage time and was controversial as it was even considered to be offside by Twente player Castaignos. The club ended February fourth in the league table.

March–May
On 2 March Feyenoord played Ajax at home, where they lost 1–2 despite taking a first-half lead. On 3 March, the club announced Fred Rutten would succeed Ronald Koeman as manager per 1 July 2014 for the 2014–15 season. Feyenoord played FC Groningen away the following Sunday. They took an early lead in the first half with a Schaken goal, De Vrij doubled the scoreline shortly after halftime leading to a 2–0 victory. On 16 March, Feyenoord played SC Heerenveen at home. Vormer and Immers both scored in the second half to give Feyenoord a 2–0 win. They went on to win their third match in a row on 30 March in a 5–0 home match against Go Ahead Eagles. Feyenoord took an early lead in De Kuip with a 13th minute Immers goal; they added four more in the second half with Vilhena, Boëtius, Te Vrede and Nelom getting on the score sheet. This win, the largest margin of victory of the season, moved Feyenoord to second place in the league table with five matches to play.

Feyenoord opened April away in Almelo against Heracles Almelo on Wednesday 2 April, a game that was moved due to the 2014 Nuclear Security Summit. The home team opened the score early; Feyenoord took the lead later in the first half with goals by Te Vrede and Vilhena. The game ended in a 2–1 win, Feyenoord's fourth consecutive, and solidified the second place with a four-point lead and four games to play. Feyenoord won their fifth consecutive game on 6 April at home against RKC Waalwijk with 2–0. Pellè scored both goals in his return from a four-game suspension. A week later Feyenoord won its sixth game in a row away at PSV 2–0. Mathijsen scored his first of the season in the first half and Janmmaat scored after the break. They kept their second place staying four points clear of third place FC Twente. Feyenoord secured the second place in the league, and the associated berth to the third qualifying round of the 2014–15 UEFA Champions League on 27 April with a 5–1 home win against SC Cambuur. Vormer scored in the first half before Cambuur equalized just before halftime; Vilhena scored twice and Pellè and Boëtius one each to arrive at the final scoreline in Feyenoord's seventh consecutive win.

Feyenoord played its last game of the season on 3 May away at AZ. The game ended in a 1–1 draw, with Immers scoring the Feyenoord goal. Feyenoord finished in second place after the 34-game season with 20 wins, seven draws and seven losses for a total of 67 points. They scored a grand total of 76 goals, the most in the league, and conceded 40, third-lowest league-wide; Pellè was the second most productive player in the Eredivisie with 23 goals.

Competitions

Overall

Eredivisie

League table

Results summary

Matches

Source: Feyenoord

KNVB Cup

Europa League

Play-off round

Friendlies

Player details

Sources: Squad numbers, Eredivisie and KNVB Cup stats, Europa League statistics

Transfers

In

Out

Loans in

Loans out

Club

Coaching staff

Kit

|
|
|
|
|

In March 2013 it was announced that Feyenoord signed a four-year deal which would make Opel the club's main sponsor and would return the name Opel to its match kit beginning at the start of the 2013–14 season. It marks a return for Opel as Feyenoord's main sponsor, a position it held from 1984 to 1989. The match kits for the new season were presented in April 2013. The home jersey was similar to the previous season version with an updated sponsor name. The away kit took design cues from the white and green colours of the flag of Rotterdam and incorporates the coat of arms of Rotterdam on the side of the jersey.

References

Feyenoord seasons
Feyenoord
Feyenoord